Bornella stellifer is a species of colorful sea slug, a nudibranch, a marine gastropod mollusk in the family Bornellidae.

References

Pola, M., Rudman, W. B. & Gosliner, T. M. (2009). "Systematics and preliminary phylogeny of Bornellidae (Mollusca: Nudibranchia: Dendronotina) based on morphological characters with description of four new species". Zootaxa 1975: 1-57.

Bornellidae
Gastropods described in 1848